Lenangsøyra Chapel is a parish church of the Church of Norway in Lyngen Municipality in Troms og Finnmark county, Norway. It is located in the village of Lenangsøyra on the Lyngen peninsula. It is one of the churches for the Lyngen parish which is part of the Nord-Troms prosti (deanery) in the Diocese of Nord-Hålogaland. The white, concrete church was built in a fan-shaped style in 1996 to serve the northern part of the municipality of Lyngen. The church was designed by the architectural firm Arkibygg ved J. Gjerdrum. The church seats about 120 people.

See also
List of churches in Nord-Hålogaland

References

Lyngen
Churches in Troms
20th-century Church of Norway church buildings
Churches completed in 1996
1996 establishments in Norway
Fan-shaped churches in Norway
Concrete churches in Norway